The Trilokpuri Sanjay Lake metro station is located on the Pink Line of the Delhi Metro.

As part of Phase III of Delhi Metro, Trilokpuri is the metro station of the Pink Line.

The station

Station layout

Facilities

Entry/Exit

Connections

Bus
Delhi Transport Corporation bus routes number 118EXT, 306, 307A, 309, 311A, 344, 378, 611, 611B, YMS(-) (+) serves the station from nearby Trilokpuri 13 Block bus stop.

See also

Delhi
List of Delhi Metro stations
Transport in Delhi
Delhi Metro Rail Corporation
Delhi Suburban Railway
Delhi Monorail
Sanjay Lake
Delhi Transport Corporation
East Delhi
New Delhi
National Capital Region (India)
List of rapid transit systems
List of metro systems

References

External links

 Delhi Metro Rail Corporation Ltd. (Official site)
 Delhi Metro Annual Reports
 
 UrbanRail.Net – descriptions of all metro systems in the world, each with a schematic map showing all stations.

Delhi Metro stations
Railway stations in East Delhi district